The Chevrolet Spark is a city car manufactured by General Motors's subsidiary GM Korea from 1998 to 2022. The vehicle was initially developed by Daewoo and was introduced in 1998 as the Daewoo Matiz. In 2002, General Motors purchased Daewoo Motors, which had the vehicle being marketed with several GM marques and nameplates.

The third generation was predominantly marketed under its Chevrolet brand, including in North America as the Chevrolet Spark and in Australia and New Zealand as the Holden Spark Barina. The fourth generation was launched in 2015, and also known as the Holden Spark in Australia and New Zealand. It also serves as the basis for the Opel Karl in Europe, Vauxhall Viva in the UK, and VinFast Fadil in Vietnam, the latter being manufactured under license.

A limited-production all-electric version, the Chevrolet Spark EV, was released in the U.S. in selected markets in California and Oregon in June 2013. The Spark EV was the first all-electric passenger car marketed by General Motors since the EV1 was discontinued in 1999, and the first ever offered for retail sale by GM (the EV1 was available only on lease).

In the South Korean market, the Spark complies with South Korean "light car" regulations, which regulate overall vehicle dimensions and engine capacity with tax and parking fee benefits.

Production of the Spark at the Changwon, South Korea assembly plant ended in 2022. The plant would instead produce the second-generation Trax. 



First generation (M100, M150; 1998)

M100 (1998–2000) 
The production of Daewoo Matiz started in 1998, and it was marketed in South Korea and many European markets, internally designated the M100. The exterior design is based on the Lucciola, a 1993 Fiat Cinquecento concept by Fabrizio Giugiaro at Italdesign, which had been rejected by Fiat. The 0.8-litre gasoline engine and the transmission were carryovers from the Daewoo Tico, but it now uses a multipoint fuel injection system. Engineering was carried out at Daewoo's Worthing Technical Centre in England. The car became the best selling Daewoo model in Europe and in India for the next four years.

It was developed on the basis of the Daewoo Tico, version under license of the Suzuki Alto, with which both Tico and Matiz share mechanicals and suspensions. From this origin derives its characteristic narrow width, imposed by the Japanese kei car tax category.

The Matiz was originally launched with just a 0.8-litre straight-three engine. This engine was developed from the Tico unit by Tickford, a UK company based in Milton Keynes. The Tickford connection was acknowledged in the brochures distributed in UK showrooms.

It was released with three trim levels: E, S, and SE. The latter had air conditioning, wheel covers, body-colored bumpers, rear spoiler, fog lights, and a stereo, with optional features such as roof rails, power steering, central locking, electric front windows, antilock brakes, and driver airbag. In certain markets, it was also available with an automatic transmission.

M150 (2000–2005) 
This facelift was designed at Daewoo's Worthing Technical Centre in England, and introduced in South Korea in late 2000, and exported from 2001. The front-end structure was modified to accommodate a four-cylinder engine, although the introduction of this engine, the 1.0-litre S-Tec unit, was delayed until after Daewoo's takeover by General Motors in 2002.

The M150 is still produced by GM-Uzbekistan (previously UzDaewooAuto) in Uzbekistan. The car was launched to the Russian market as the Ravon Matiz in 2016, but was soon discontinued. In South Korea and Japan this updated Matiz was sold under the name Daewoo Matiz II.

Lechi (China) 
In China, the car was marketed as the Chevrolet Lechi. It remained in production until 2012, when an updated version was introduced as the Baojun Lechi. It is to be offered under both Chevrolet and Baojun brands during a transition period. The Lechi has also received certain powertrain updates, making the car economical enough to qualify for a subsidy and a tax break from the Chinese government.

Safety 
Euro NCAP test results for a RHD, 5five-door hatchback variant on a 2000 registration:

Engines 
It featured a range of three petrol engines, which had these specifications:

Copying controversy 

The Chery QQ3, then known as the Chery QQ, became the center of an industrial copyright and intellectual rights controversy, as GM claimed the car was a copy of the Daewoo Matiz. GM executives demonstrated the extent of the design duplication, noting for example that the doors of the QQ and those of the Spark are interchangeable without modification.

GM China Group indicated the two vehicles "shared remarkably identical body structure, exterior design, interior design, and key components" MotorAuthority.com and Car and Driver called the QQ a "carbon copy", while the International Herald Tribune, in a 2005 article, referred to it as a clone.

The Detroit News reported that "the dispute reflects the confusion, risks, and ambitions in China's new auto industry, where global carmakers are battling pugnacious upstarts for a piece of what may become the world's largest auto market."

Second generation (M200, M250; 2005) 

In 2005, the Matiz received substantial modifications (M200), previewed by the Chevrolet M3X concept car shown at 2004 Paris Motor Show. The upper body was revised, based again on a design by Italdesign Giugiaro, the S-Tec engines were updated, and the car's drag coefficient was lowered, resulting in better fuel economy. The interior was also significantly revised, notably with a centre-mounted instrument cluster. The platform was also revised, with a twist-beam rear suspension system replacing the previous three-link beam axle, and the front suspension using cast, rather than pressed and fabricated lower control arms.

In 2008, the 800 cc engine was revised to fall below the 120 g/km level, thus qualifying for the UK's £35 road tax band and no London congestion charge.

In Europe, it was marketed under the names Chevrolet Matiz and Chevrolet Spark. In Italy, the LPG version was called Chevrolet Matiz Eco Logic; it was built from 2007 to 2010 in over 60,000 vehicles by BRC Gas Equipment in Cherasco, Cuneo, Italy.

In South Korea, where it was marketed only with an 800 cc engine and following the introduction of M300 Matiz (Matiz Creative), the M200 Matiz was renamed to Matiz Classic
Production reach 2.3 million worldwide during the first 10 years.

As of 2011, VIDAMCO of Vietnam produces the Matiz M200 as the Chevrolet Spark Lite in complete knock-down (CKD) form at its Hanoi production facility.

In India, the local manufacturer GM India produced two special editions of this generation - the Chevrolet Spark LPG, a version equipped with a sequential injection-type liquified petroleum gas kit, unveiled on the World Environment Day in New Delhi, and the Chevrolet Spark Muzic, introduced in 2009.

Safety 
Euro NCAP test results for a five-door hatchback variant on a 2005 registration:

Engines

Third generation (M300; 2009) 

The redesigned Matiz (codenamed M300) was launched in 2009 and is based on the 2007 Chevrolet Beat concept car. Although sold globally as the Chevrolet Spark, in India, this model retains the Beat name from the concept car, as the second-generation Spark continues to be sold in this market. In some Latin American markets, the Beat name was also used, while Chile, Colombia, Ecuador, Mexico, and Peru received it as the Spark GT. Prior to the 2011 elimination of the Daewoo marque in South Korea, the third-generation Spark was marketed as the Daewoo Matiz Creative.

GM presented a pre-production version of the Chevrolet Beat carrying the Chevrolet Spark nameplate at the 2009 North American International Auto Show. The production version was announced at that show, but only the Beat concept was shown.

The production Chevrolet Spark was unveiled at the 2009 Geneva Motor Show. It became available in Europe in the first quarter of 2010, followed by other markets worldwide, with US sales set to begin in early 2012 for 2013 model year. Production of the car started from December 2009 in Halol, Gujarat, India. It was launched in India in January 2010 as the Chevrolet Beat during Auto Expo in New Delhi.

With the M300, the original Suzuki platform was replaced by GM Global Small Vehicles platform, developed by GM Daewoo engineers.

Concept 
The Chevrolet Beat concept car was unveiled at the 2007 New York International Auto Show alongside two other concept vehicles, the Trax and the Groove. The Beat is a three-door hatchback concept, derived from the Daewoo Kalos. It was designed by GM Daewoo in South Korea. It is powered by a 1.2 L turbocharged gasoline engine mated to an automatic transmission.

This version was featured in the Michael Bay movie Transformers: Revenge of the Fallen as Skids, alongside the GM Trax subcompact SUV. The Beat concept sports a Vertigo Green exterior paint job with the same hue carried over to parts of the interior. Its profile is high at the rear and tapering down evenly to the front of the grille. Headlights that appear to extend all the way from the base of the grille to the base of the windshield are LED type. It feature 17-inch wheels with matching green paint of the disc brakes. Twin taillights that extend upward to the back-up lights are also LEDs.

In early 2007, GM conducted a poll testing the relative popularity of the Beat, Trax, and Groove concepts on a Chevrolet website, with the Beat receiving nearly 50% of the vote, which ultimately determined the car making it into production.

GM displayed a prototype woodie version of the forthcoming Chevrolet Spark for the 2010 Paris Motor Show.

Facelifts 
The first facelift was revealed at the 2012 Paris Motor Show. It features a redesigned dual-port grille and front bumper, and restyled headlamp covers and fog lamps. The North American model, launched for the 2013 model year, uses the facelifted styling. The first facelift model was launched in India in February 2014. The facelifted Holden Barina Spark retained the existing front bumper, with its front grille being redesigned.

A second facelift was launched in 2017 for the 2018 year with a design inspired by the fourth-generation Spark (M400). Produced in India and Colombia, it is aimed mainly to developing countries.

Beat sedan/notchback (NB) 

A four-door sedan version was unveiled in a near-production prototype form at the 2016 Auto Expo in India as the Chevrolet Essentia. After GM halted domestic sales in India in 2017, the Essentia was ultimately cancelled for the Indian market. The model was instead exported to Latin America either in finished form or as knock-down kits (to be assembled by GM Colmotores) as the Beat or Beat NB (notchback).

The Beat and its notchback version were discontinued from the Mexican market in early August 2021, giving the production run from 2018 to 2021 model years. The Taxi variant of the Beat Notchback is still available for the Colombian market for the 2022 model year.

Spark/Beat Activ 

A crossover-styled version is also available in South America as the Chevrolet Spark GT Activ or Chevrolet Beat Activ. The concept version was showcased at the 2016 Auto Expo in India, however the production version was never sold in India as GM pulled out from the market. The production version is available in several Latin American markets starting from 2018.

Markets

United States 
The U.S. version of the third-generation Spark went into production on April 16, 2012, and arrived in dealerships in August 2012. Marketed as the Chevrolet Spark, the car uses a special up-stroked version of the "S-TEC" engine (RPO code LL0).

The 2013 Spark was the fastest-selling car in the United States for July 2012, with just 6 days from when they arrived at dealers to when they were sold.

For 2014, the automatic transmission is a Jatco M4M-CVT7 continuously variable transmission (CVT) and the final drive ratio lowered to 3.75. The CVT gives better fuel mileage overall than the previous 4 speed automatic, and changing the final drive ratio from its previous 4.145 reduces engine noise and increases fuel economy on the highway while increasing noise and reducing fuel mileage in the city. Industry sources have commented on the ongoing reliability issues with the Jatco CVT transmissions.

Domino's DXP 
The Domino's DXP (short for "Delivery eXPert") is a version 2015 Spark marketed in the U.S., which was customized by Roush Performance for Domino's Pizza where it was converted to a revival of a canopy express vehicle which was popular from the 1930s to the 1950s. Based on the mid-level 1LT trim of the Spark, the front and rear passenger seats are removed and replaced with storage compartments that can carry 80 pizzas, two 2-liter bottles of soda, and dipping sauces. The left rear passenger door is converted into a warming oven that can only be unlocked with the key fob or a button within the driver's door frame. The Spark's Chevrolet front grille is replaced with a custom-made black front grille with the "Domino's" logo, as well as a custom lower body kit, and all DXP cars have a custom Domino's-themed vinyl wrap with a lighted Domino's roof topper.

Production is limited to less than 200 units and once each car reaches 100,000 miles, it will be retired and returned to Roush, where it will be restored to stock form and sold as a used Spark (all four factory seatbelts and airbags are left fully intact, and covered by plastic panels). Despite the intentions of Domino's to eventually retire the DXP and leave none remaining, several wrecked DXPs have been salvaged by private individuals with the intention of retaining them as rare cars when the rest of the fleet is retired. The situation has resulted in threatened legal action by a Domino's franchisee.

Europe 
The third-generation Spark was unveiled at the 2009 Geneva Motor Show. It became available in Europe in the first quarter of 2010. Engine choices include 1.0- and 1.2-litre I4 engines. In Italy there is an LPG version of the Spark called the Chevrolet Spark Eco Logic with BRC Gas Equipment as of the end of 2009. This bi-fuel version is available with the 1.0 and 1.2 engines (both with 16 valves) with 113 to 119 g of CO2 emissions respectively. While the LPG cars are still available in Italy, in France the LPG versions were only available from 2009 until 2012.

India 
Production of the third-generation, badged as the Beat, started at Halol plant near Ahmedabad in Gujarat in December 15, 2009. It was launched in India on January 5, 2010, during Auto Expo in New Delhi. The Beat was marketed alongside the second-generation Spark, which was offered as a more affordable alternative. The Beat is powered by a 1.2 L S-TEC II engine capable of petrol and LPG, marketed as Smartech II. The engine was destroked from 1,206 cc to 1,199 cc for the Indian market due to lower tax imposed to vehicles with engine displacement under 1,200 cc.

In July 2011, General Motors launched the diesel version of the Beat in India. Chevrolet Beat Diesel offers mileage of 24 km/L (56 mpg) as per the ARAI test reports. The engine is based on the Fiat Multijet diesel technology.

GM India was reported to build an electric version of the Spark or Beat with Reva Electric Car Company. However, after the acquisition of Reva Electric Car Company by Mahindra & Mahindra, GM India dropped the plans, and planned its own electric version.

In Auto Expo 2016 in February, GM India showcased the four-door sedan version of the Beat as the Chevrolet Essentia, and a crossover-styled concept model as the Beat Activ. Both models never went on sale in India as Chevrolet ceased sales in the country in 2017, however these models were exported to Latin America until 2021.

Mexico 
In North America, the third-generation Spark was first delivered to GM dealerships in Mexico for the 2012 model year, but did not replace the Chevrolet Matiz (formerly Pontiac G2 Matiz), which was sold until 2014. In 2017, the third-generation Spark received a facelift and was renamed the Chevrolet Beat.

On 5 August 2021, the Beat was discontinued in Mexico due to the Talegaon, India, plant being closed, leaving the Aveo as their entry-level model in said market.

Philippines 
In the Philippines, the third-generation Spark is equipped with 1.0 L and 1.2 L engines. It has 2 trims; the LS (5-speed manual or 4-speed automatic) and LT (5-speed manual). It was discontinued in 2015.

South Korea 

The car was unveiled in South Korea as the Daewoo Matiz Creative at the 2009 Seoul Motor Show. The Matiz version was renamed to Matiz Creative. The car has a 1.0 L S-TEC II engine with 4-speed automatic transmission. Sales began on September 1, 2009. The Groove name used in one of the rejected concepts returned as a trim level.

In 2011, the Matiz Creative is renamed as Chevrolet Spark, as part of phasing out the Daewoo brand in South Korea, making way for the Chevrolet brand.

Australia 
In Australia, the third-generation Spark was released in October 2010 at the 2010 Australian International Motor Show in Sydney as the MJ series Holden Barina Spark. It was available in two trim levels, CD and CDX. It was discontinued in February 2018 to be replaced by the fourth-generation model.

Uzbekistan 

The Chevrolet Spark was released in Uzbekistan in August 2010. It was available in three trim levels: L (1.0 L manual), LS (1.0 L manual/auto) and LT (1.2 L manual).

Russia 
The Uzbekistan-made Spark has been sold in Russia as the Ravon R2 since 2016. It was available with the 1.2 L engine and automatic gearbox.

Safety 
The Korean-made Spark in its most basic Latin American configuration with no airbags and no ABS received 0 stars for adult occupants and 2 stars for toddlers from Latin NCAP in 2014.

The Indian-made Spark GT in its most basic Latin American configuration with no airbags, no ABS and no ESC received 0 stars for adult occupants and 0 stars for toddlers from Latin NCAP in 2016 (one level above 2010–2015).

Powertrain

Spark EV 

The Chevrolet Spark EV is a limited production 5-door hatchback battery electric vehicle produced by Chevrolet in 2013–2016. The Spark EV was a compliance car specifically designed to meet the government mandate on automobile manufacturers to increase the penetration of electric automobiles into the fleet of all operating vehicles on the road in certain US states, but was not intended for broad adoption in the broader US market, nor produced and sold in quantities that would meet demand for such vehicles in the open market where no such government rules exist.

In October 2011, General Motors announced the planned production of the Chevrolet Spark EV, with availability limited to select markets starting in 2013. The production version was unveiled at the November 2012 Los Angeles Auto Show. Within the framework of GM's vehicle electrification strategy, the Spark EV was the first all-electric passenger car marketed by General Motors in the U.S. since the EV1, which had been discontinued in 1999.

Sales
The Spark EV was released in the U.S. in June 2013, with availability initially limited to the markets in California and Oregon. The first vehicle was leased to a family in the Studio City neighborhood of Los Angeles. The electric car went on sale in Maryland in the second quarter of 2015, the first East Coast state where the Spark EV was available.

, U.S. sales totaled 1,684 units. Sales jumped by approximately nine times, from an average of 100 per month to 920 in April 2015 alone, in response to the price cut. The Spark EV was discontinued in December 2016, when Chevrolet began selling the Bolt, which had a much longer range and wider availability. In total, it was estimated from incentive data that 7,371 Spark EVs were sold or leased to customers in the United States, including a few leftover vehicles in 2017.

Retail sales of the Spark EV began in South Korea in October 2013. The Spark was also available in Canada for limited fleet sales starting in 2014.

Technical
The electric car was initially powered by a 21.3 kWh Lithium iron phosphate battery pack supplied by A123 Systems. In a white-paper, the A123 nanophosphate cathode material was touted as increasing battery life and safety. In 2014, for the 2015 model year, the battery pack supplier was changed to LG Chem which resulted in a smaller capacity pack (19 kWh) while maintaining the same EV range, which was estimated at  under the EPA cycle for all model years. It is carried over the rear axle and is equipped with a liquid thermal management system.

The Spark EV is equipped with a standard onboard charger that can accept AC power at a maximum rate of 3.3 kW. When equipped with an optional CCS/SAE Combo Type 1 DC power inlet, the Spark EV can be fast-charged to 80% of capacity in 20 minutes. Using the onboard AC charger, charging time increases to about seven hours using a dedicated 240-volt charging station or about 20 hours using a standard household 120-volt outlet. It is the first car in the United States to offer a CCS Combo inlet.

The 2014 production version featured a  motor, providing  of torque. The electric motor and final drive unit were assembled in GM's Baltimore Operations plant in White Marsh, then shipped to South Korea where they were fitted to the vehicles.

Fourth generation (M400; 2015) 

The fourth-generation Spark, internally designated M400, was styled under the direction of GM Global Design Chief Michael Simcoe, debuted at the April 2015 New York International Auto Show and went on sale in the fourth quarter of 2015. It was also marketed as the Holden Spark in Australia and New Zealand. A restyled version was marketed as the Opel Karl in Europe, Vauxhall Viva in the UK, and VinFast Fadil in Vietnam (produced under license). These nameplates feature revised instrument panel styling, revised side swaging and a small quarter light in the rear door, displacing the high-mounted rear door handles of the Spark.

Powertrain 
In North America, at introduction, the fourth-generation Spark is powered by a 1.4-litre,  LV7 DOHC I4 gasoline engine producing  and  torque. The Korean domestic version as well as Opel, Vauxhall and Holden variants used a 1.0 L engine producing 75 hp and 70 pound-feet torque.

Markets

United States 
In the United States, the Spark is available in four trim levels: base LS, mid-level 1LT, lifestyle-oriented ACTIV (available starting with the 2017 model year), and top-tier 2LT. Each trim level is available with either a standard five-speed manual transmission, or a continuously variable transmission (CVT).

Mexico 
The Spark was launched for the Mexican market on November 4, 2015, as a 2016 model and only offered in the LT and LTZ trim lines, both of them powered by a 1.4-liter engine.

2018 facelift 
In 2018, for the 2019 model year, the Spark received a mid-cycle facelift. Changes included a new third-generation seven-inch Chevrolet Infotainment 3 infotainment system, revised exterior styling, optional low-speed autonomous emergency braking (AEB) on selected models, and new exterior color options. In the United States, the facelifted Spark went on sale in the third quarter of 2018 for model year 2019. For Mexico, the model was facelifted in October 2018 as a 2019 model, discontinuing the LTZ trim line and adding the Premier and Activ trim lines.

Spark Activ

For the 2018 model year, GM introduced the Activ trim level between the 1LT and 2LT trims, including leatherette-trimmed seating surfaces, heated front seats, leather-wrapped steering wheel, aluminum-alloy wheels, unique black exterior styling elements, roof rails, rear liftgate badging, and ground clearance increased by 0.4 inches.
 It was never offered for sale in Canada.

Discontinuation 
Chevrolet discontinued the Spark after the 2022 model year. Production ceased in August 2022. The Spark was the United States and Canada's least expensive new car on sale. Production for South Korea was scheduled to cease in September 8, 2022.

Global marketing and manufacture

Asia 
In India, it was launched in 1999 as the Daewoo Matiz. In 2007, General Motors India launched the Chevrolet M3X concept based third generation, as the Chevrolet Spark. In Japan, the Matiz was sold under the GM Daewoo brand through the Yanase Co., Ltd. dealership network, but was considered a "compact car" due to the length, width and engine displacement exceeding the Kei car regulations. In the Philippines, the Matiz was available during the years 1999–2000 through the grey market. In 2007, it was released under the name Chevrolet Spark. In Pakistan, the car was initially introduced as Chevrolet Exclusive in 2003. From 2005 to 2009 it was manufactured by Nexus Automotive (importers and assemblers of General Motors Korea and Daewoo vehicles in Pakistan) under the name Chevrolet Joy, which has now been replaced by the newer M200 series and is currently sold as the Chevrolet Spark. In Taiwan, the Matiz was sold under the Formosa brand between 2001 and 2009.

Europe 
From 1998 until 2004, the Matiz was sold in Europe under the Daewoo badge. In 2004, it took the Chevrolet marque, as well as the other South Korean models of General Motors, such as the Lacetti and Kalos. Since 2000, CKD kits have been supplied to UzDaewooAuto, FSO and Rodae, to be built and sold in Uzbekistan, Poland and Romania respectively. At the beginning of 2005, FSO began marketing the Matiz under their own brand. The Chevrolet Matiz were briefly marketed as the Chevrolet Spark in the UK. The fourth generation was marketed in most of Europe as the Opel Karl and as the Vauxhall Viva in the UK until both were discontinued in 2019.

Americas 
In Mexico, the Matiz was introduced to the market in 2003. The 2006 model was renamed to Pontiac Matiz G2. It was also sold as Pontiac Matiz and Pontiac G2. The Pontiac G2 was discontinued in Mexico after a short run of 2010 models as the brand was closed by General Motors. The new version was officially launched as the Chevrolet Spark in August 2010, and the Matiz continues to be sold alongside the Spark. An M300-based vehicle is currently in production in Brazil as a replacement for the Chevrolet Celta. In Colombia, the Matiz was imported by Daewoo distributors between 2002 and 2005 and then GM Colmotores began to assemble and sell it branded as Chevrolet Spark. In 2006, a taxi version called 7/24 was launched. In Costa Rica, Dominican Republic, El Salvador, Honduras, Panama, Uruguay and Venezuela, it is sold as the Chevrolet Spark. In Argentina, the first generation was sold as the Daewoo Matiz through Daewoo importers. The second generation was sold as Chevrolet Spark through Chevrolet dealers. Since 2011, the third generation is available. In Chile, Ecuador, and Peru, the former version is sold as the Chevrolet Spark, and the latest version as the Chevrolet Spark GT. In Paraguay, it was initially sold as Daewoo Matiz, but from 2008, it is sold through Chevrolet dealers.

In North America, the Spark was initially marketed in three trim levels, 1LS, 1LT, and 2LT, as well as the EV.

In Canada, the Spark has been marketed as the country's least expensive new car from the 2016 model year, with a starting price of $9,988.  For that price, the base Spark does not include air conditioning, and comes with a manual transmission. It competed with the similarly priced Nissan Micra (until that car's discontinuation in Canada as of the 2019 model year).

Africa 
In South Africa, General Motors South Africa (GMSA) announced on October 2, 2010, plans to manufacture the new Chevrolet Spark at its Port Elizabeth plant. The second generation Spark is still sold, though branded as a 'Spark Lite'.

Middle East 
In Iran, the Matiz was produced (first imported and later assembled) and known as Daewoo Matiz. In Israel, UMI (Universal Motors Israel) announced on January 18, 2011, the marketing commencement of the 1.2L Chevrolet Spark model.

Australasia 

Within Australia and New Zealand, the Spark was sold through the Holden brand. Sales commenced in February 2016, with two specifications launched. The LS was the base specification, which features steel wheels, central locking as well as Holden's MyLink infotainment system. Building upon the LS, the LT adds 15 inch alloy wheels, keyless entry and a rear view camera.

With light car sales decreasing in Australia, Holden announced in April 2018 that they would discontinue the Spark in Australia. Although, it continued to be sold in New Zealand until the demise of the Holden brand in 2020.

Sales

See also 
 Opel Karl

Notes

References

External links 

 

2000s cars
2010s cars
Cars introduced in 1998
Spark
Matiz
Spark
City cars
Euro NCAP superminis
Latin NCAP superminis
Front-wheel-drive vehicles
Hatchbacks
Vehicles with CVT transmission